The 1991–92 BCAFL was the seventh full season of the British Collegiate American Football League, organised by the British Students American Football Association.

Changes from last season
Division Changes
There were no changes to the Divisional setup.

Team Changes
Lancaster University joined the Northern Conference, as the Bombers
Newcastle Mariners withdrew at the end of the previous season
University of Oxford joined the Southern Conference, as the Cavaliers
This increased the number of teams in BCAFL to 20.

Regular season

Northern Conference

Southern Conference

Playoffs

Note – the table does not indicate who played home or away in each fixture.

References

External links
 Official BUAFL Website
 Official BAFA Website

1991–92
1991 in British sport
1992 in British sport
1991 in American football
1992 in American football